Erez Markovich (ארז מרקוביץ; born July 10, 1978) is an Israeli former basketball player who played the center position. He played in the Jeep Élite league, in the Israeli Basketball Premier League, and for the Israeli national basketball team.

Biography
Markovich was born in Eilat, Israel.

He played basketball for Paris Racing Basket of the Pro A league, and in the Israeli Basketball Premier League for Maccabi Rishon LeZion, Maccabi Ramat Gan, Elitzur Ashkelon, Maccabi Ironi Nahariya, and Hapoel Jerusalem. Markovich played in the 2003 Israeli Basketball All-Star Game, and on the 2005 FIBA EuroCup All-Star Day.

Markovich also played for the Israeli national basketball team as a junior in the 1996 European Championship for Men 22 and Under, and as a senior in the 2003 European Championship for Men, 2005 EuroBasket, 2007 EuroBasket, and 2009 EuroChallenge.

References 

Living people
1978 births
Israeli men's basketball players
Paris Racing Basket players
Maccabi Rishon LeZion basketball players
Ironi Ramat Gan players
Ironi Ashkelon players
Ironi Nahariya players
Hapoel Jerusalem B.C. players
Israeli Basketball Premier League players
People from Eilat